Peacock is an American over-the-top subscription video on demand streaming service owned and operated by NBCUniversal, a subsidiary of Comcast. The full service launched on July 15, 2020. Early availability began on April 15, 2020 for Xfinity Flex customers, followed by X1 customers by May 1.

Original programming

Drama

Comedy

Animation

Unscripted

Docuseries

Reality

Variety

Sports

Co-productions
These shows have been commissioned by Peacock with a partner network.

Continuations
These shows have been picked up by Peacock for additional seasons after having aired previous seasons on another network.

Specials
These shows are one-time original events or supplementary content related to original TV shows.

Exclusive international distribution

Programming under Telemundo's TPlus

Scripted

Drama

Comedy

Unscripted

Reality

Original films

Feature films

Documentaries

Specials

Exclusive international distribution

Upcoming original programming

Drama

Comedy

Animation

Unscripted

Docuseries

Reality

Programming under Telemundo's TPlus

Scripted

Drama

Unscripted

Docuseries

Co-productions

In development

Upcoming original films

Feature films

Documentaries

Notes

References

Peacock